Jaime Ojeda (born 3 August 1963) is a Chilean long-distance runner. He competed in the men's marathon at the 1992 Summer Olympics.

References

1963 births
Living people
Athletes (track and field) at the 1992 Summer Olympics
Chilean male long-distance runners
Chilean male marathon runners
Olympic athletes of Chile
Place of birth missing (living people)